Florennes Air Base  is a Belgian Air Component military airfield located  east southeast of Florennes, a Walloon municipality of Belgium. It is home to the 2nd Tactical Wing, operating F-16 Fighting Falcons. It also used to be the home to the Tactical Leadership Programme (TLP), a joint training program formed by ten NATO members. On July 31, 2009, TLP moved to Albacete in Spain.

Units
During World War II, German Luftwaffe fighter units operated from here, including Ju 88 and Bf 110 night fighters, and Focke-Wulf Fw 190 day fighters. It was captured in September 1944, after which Allied units operating from here included the USAAF's 430th Fighter Squadron, flying Lockheed Lockheed P-38 Lightnings in the ground attack role, and the 422nd Night Fighter Squadron, flying Northrop P-61 Black Widows.  From 1984 to 1990, the US Air Force 485th Tactical Missile Wing was located at Florennes, deploying the BGM-109G Ground Launched Cruise Missile system, which were removed in 1989 as part of the Intermediate-Range Nuclear Forces Treaty.

Currently, two fighter squadrons operate out of Florennes air base. 1 Squadron, which was started in 1917 and 350 Squadron, founded in the UK in 1942 during the Second World War. Both units fly the F-16 Fighting Falcon.

Notable incidents
On 11 October 2018 a Belgian Air Force F-16 caught fire during maintenance works at the base. The fire, reportedly caused by the accidental firing of a canon, completely destroyed that aircraft. A second F-16 received collateral damage.

See also

Transportation in Belgium
Advanced Landing Ground

References

External links
 
 Tactical Leadership Programme
 Belgian Defence Force (French & Dutch)
 485th Tactical Missile Wing

Belgian airbases
Airfields of the United States Army Air Forces in Belgium
World War II airfields in Belgium
Airports in Namur (province)
Airports established in 1936
Florennes